Kpouèbo is a town in south-central Ivory Coast. It is a sub-prefecture of Toumodi Department in Bélier Region, Lacs District.

Kpouèbo was a commune until March 2012, when it became one of 1126 communes nationwide that were abolished.

In 2014, the population of the sub-prefecture of Kpouèbo was 25,473.

Villages
The 12 villages of the sub-prefecture of Kpouèbo and their population in 2014 are:

References

Sub-prefectures of Bélier
Former communes of Ivory Coast